C is a restaurant in Tampere, Finland, selected as restaurant of the year in early 2011. The restaurant received recognition especially for quality ingredients, food preparation according to seasons and good matching between food and wine.

The restaurant is located right west from the Tampere Central Station in the district of Kyttälä. The chief cook of C is Ilkka Isotalo and the sommelier is Christina Suominen. Restaurant Perla was previously located at the same address.

References

External links
 Official site
 Laitinen, Vesa: Ravintola C on Tampereen paras kunnes toisin todistetaan, Aamulehti 29 July 2016
 Kinnunen, Jari: Tampereen parhaat ravintolat ja muut ruokakohteet, mtv.fi 24 February 2015
 C at TripAdvisor
 C at Lonely Planet
 Romanttisimmat ravintolat, visittampere.fi

Restaurants in Finland
Kyttälä